Johannes-Rudolf Norman (also Johannes-Rudolf Normann; 23 March 1881 – ?) was an Estonian politician. He was a member of III Riigikogu. He was a member of the Riigikogu since 4 January 1928. He replaced Karl Johannes Virma. On 23 January 1928, he resigned his position and he was replaced by Karl Kaal.

References

1881 births
Members of the Riigikogu, 1926–1929
Year of death missing